Valentin Viktorovich Mogilny  (18 December 1965 – 22 November 2015) was an artistic gymnast who competed for the USSR during the 1980s. His teammates were Yuri Korolev, Dmitri Bilozerchev, Valeri Liukin, and Vladimir Artemov. He trained at the Army Club in Leninsk-Kuznetsky, then moved to Moscow to work with coach Alexander Alexandrov.  Mogilny was divorced from his wife Olga Bicherova (1981 world champion), with whom he had a son. Mogilny lived his last years in France, where he became a citizen, and worked as a coach. He died after a heart attack in 2015.

References

1965 births
2015 deaths
Ukrainian male artistic gymnasts
Soviet male artistic gymnasts
Medalists at the World Artistic Gymnastics Championships
European champions in gymnastics